E.S.P. (Extra Sexual Persuasion) is a Millie Jackson album released in 1983. In addition to her signature soul music songs, it also includes somewhat more Hi-NRG and Funk dance song production popular at the time such as "This Girl Could Be Dangerous", "Sexercise" and the title track.

Critical reception 
In a contemporary review for The Village Voice, music critic Robert Christgau gave the album a "B−" and wrote that, despite her mannerisms and persuasive parodies of sexercise, Jackson lacks the redeeming slow songs of her past work, and both "Slow Tongue" and the title track sound contrived.

Track listing
 "E.S.P." (Deborah Allen, Steve Diamond, Rafe Van Hoy) – 3:58
 "Too Easy Being Easy" (Barry Beckett, Millie Jackson, Brad Shapiro) – 7:00
 "This Girl Could Be Dangerous" (Wood Newton, Michael Noble) – 3:01
 I Feel Like Walkin' In The Rain" (A.C. Graham, Wayne Perkins) – 3:58
 "Sexercise (Pt.1)" (Bruce Fischel, Vicky Germaise, Millie Jackson, Randy Klein) – 3:00
 "Sexercise (Pt. 2)" (Bruce Fischel, Vicky Germaise, Millie Jackson, Randy Klein) – 2:41
 "You're Working Me" (David B. Lindsey) – 4:07
 "Slow Tongue" (Bruce Fischel, Vicky Germaise, Randy Klein) – 4:58
 "Why Me" (Millie Jackson, Wayne Perkins, Brad Shapiro) – 3:24

Personnel 

Pete Green – assistant engineer, mixing
David Hood – bass
Millie Jackson – vocals, producer
Jimmy Johnson – engineer
Carl Marsh – keyboards
Steve Nathan – keyboards
Wayne Perkins – guitar
Donna McElroy, Michael Mishaw, Vicky Hampton - background vocals
Ben Cauley, Charles Rose, Harrison Callaway, Jr., Harvey Thompson - horns
Chris Popham – design
Brad Shapiro – producer
Regor Snikwah (actually Roger Hawkins) - drum programming
Chuck Stewart – photography

References

External links
 
  statistics, tagging and previews at Last.FM

1983 albums
Millie Jackson albums
Albums produced by Brad Shapiro
Sire Records albums